Francesco Buhagiar (7 September 1876 – 27 June 1934) was the second Prime Minister of Malta (1923–1924). He was elected from the Maltese Political Union.

Biography 

Son of Michele Buhagiar and Filomena Mifsud, Francesco Buhagiar was born in Qrendi on the 7 September 1876,. He graduated in Law from the  Royal University of Malta in 1901 and started a career as a lawyer in civil and commercial law.

After twenty years practicing law, with Malta's self-rule Buhagiar was elected to the Legislative Assembly at the 1921 election on the list of Ignazio Panzavecchia's Unione Politica Maltese (UPM). From October 1922 he served as Minister of Justice, and one year later was appointed to replace Joseph Howard as prime minister. He led a minority government throughout 1924, on the run-up and follow-up to the  June 1924 election, in which the UPM only got 10 seats.

He was then appointed as judge of the Superior Courts, where he served until 1934.

He died at 57 of complications from appendicitis at the Blue Sisters Hospital and was buried at the Addolorata Cemetery.
 
Francesco Buhagiar was married to Enrichetta Said and they had five children.
He is remembered as an accomplished jurist, a practical man and a highly respected politician.

See also
Prime Minister of Malta 
List of prime ministers of Malta

References

1876 births
1934 deaths
Prime Ministers of Malta
Maltese Political Union politicians
People from Qrendi
20th-century Maltese politicians
Burials at Addolorata Cemetery, Paola